Funny Face is the soundtrack to the 1957 film of the same name, with music by George Gershwin, from his Broadway musical Funny Face (1927), and new songs composed by the film's producer Roger Edens, .

The film was Astaire's first with Audrey Hepburn, who played his love interest, Funny Face bears little relation to the George and Ira Gershwin musical of the same name.

Reception

The Allmusic review by William Ruhlmann awarded the album 3.5 stars and described Eden's music as "mediocre", adding that "more objectionably...(Eden) rewrites many of Ira Gershwin's lyrics and even some of George Gershwin's music". Ruhlmann praises Astaire as "typically effective"

Track listing

In 2017, the 60th anniversary of the film, Verve reissued the album: resequenced the tracks to respect the order in which the songs where heard on the screen, restored the edited songs and added eight bonus tracks.

All music composed by George Gershwin, and all lyrics written by Ira Gershwin, with the exception of Think Pink!, Bonjour, Paris! and On How to Be Lovely by Roger Edens (music) and Leonard Gershe (lyrics).

Personnel

Performance

Fred Astaire - vocals
Kay Thompson - vocals
Audrey Hepburn - vocals

Other personnel
George Gershwin - composer: A-1a, A-2, A-3, A-4, B-1, B-2, B-5, B,6, B7
Ira Gershwin - lyricist: A-1a, A-2, A-3, A-4, B-1, B-2, B-5, B,6, B7
Roger Edens - composer: A-2b, A-5, B-3, B-4
Leonard Gershe - lyricist: A-2b, A-5, B-3, B-4
 
Adolph Deutsch - conductor
Van Cleave - arranger
Alexander Courage - arranger
Skip Martin - arranger
Conrad Salinger - arranger
  
Norman Granz - album producer
Richard Avedon - front and back-cover photographs of Audrey Hepburn
Bill Avery - photographs of Fred Astaire

References

1957 soundtrack albums
Verve Records soundtracks
Albums produced by Norman Granz
Fred Astaire albums
Albums conducted by Roger Edens
Kay Thompson albums
Audrey Hepburn albums
Comedy film soundtracks
Musical film soundtracks